

The Levasseur PL.10 was a carrier-based reconnaissance aircraft developed in France in the late 1920s. It was a conventional, single-bay biplane along similar lines to Levasseur's contemporary designs for the French navy, including a watertight, boat-shaped fuselage, small underwing floats, and undercarriage that could be jettisoned in flight in order to improve the changes of a successful ditching.

Thirty of these machines were purchased by the Aéronavale, entering service aboard the carrier Béarn in 1931 under the designation R3b. In 1935, these were followed by thirty examples of an improved version, the PL.101, which replaced the original PL.10s in service aboard the carrier.

The PL.10 also radically revised in the PL.107 torpedo bomber prototypes of 1937. These featured a fully enclosed cockpit that also enclosed the mounting between the fuselage and upper wing, therefore moving the fuselage higher in the interplane gap. To compensate for this, the lower wing was replaced with one of inverse gull design, and the main undercarriage units were moved to its "low points" and provided with spats. Two prototypes were evaluated and rejected by the Aéronavale. Levasseur then made one final attempt to sell the PL.10 design in the PL.108, which was generally similar to the PL.107s. This first flew on 26 September 1939, but proved no more promising than its predecessors.

Variants
 PL.10 - original version with Hispano-Suiza 12Lb engine (30 built)
 PL.101 - revised version with Hispano-Suiza 12Lb engine, wider-track undercarriage, and slight sweepback on the wings (30 built)
 PL.107 - torpedo bomber version with enclosed cockpit, new lower wing, spatted undercarriage and Gnome-Rhône 9Kfr engine (2 built)
 PL.108 - similar to PL.107, but with Hispano-Suiza 9Vbrs (1 built)

Units using this aircraft

 Aéronavale
 Escadrille 7S1

Specifications (PL.101)

Notes

References
 
 aviafrance.com
 Уголок неба

1920s French military reconnaissance aircraft
Carrier-based aircraft
Levasseur aircraft
Biplanes
Single-engined tractor aircraft
Aircraft first flown in 1929